Sertifera is a genus of flowering plants from the orchid family, Orchidaceae, native to northwestern South America.

The following species are recognized as of June 2014:

Sertifera aurantiaca C.Schweinf. - Colombia, Venezuela
Sertifera colombiana Schltr.  - Colombia, Venezuela
Sertifera grandifolia L.O.Williams - Colombia
Sertifera lehmanniana (Kraenzl.) Garay - Ecuador
Sertifera major Schltr.  - Colombia, Ecuador
Sertifera parviflora Schltr.  - Colombia, Ecuador
Sertifera purpurea Lindl. & Rchb.f.  - Colombia, Ecuador

See also
 List of Orchidaceae genera

References

Sobralieae
Sobralieae genera
Orchids of South America